Andrea Heinrich (born 17 February 1972) is a German former footballer. She was a member of the Germany women's national football team in 1990 and played in four matches. On club level she played for FSV Frankfurt.

References

External links
 
 Profile at soccerdonna.de

1972 births
Living people
German women's footballers
Place of birth missing (living people)
Germany women's international footballers
Women's association football defenders